Su Donglin (born March 1960) is a Chinese engineer specializing in electromagnetic compatibility. She is an academician of the Chinese Academy of Engineering and a professor at Beihang University. She has been hailed as "female electromagnetic detective".

Biography
Su was born in Laiwu District of Jinan, Shandong, in March 1960. She studied and then taught at Beihang University. She was a visiting scholar at the University of California, Los Angeles.

Honours and awards
 2018 State Technological Invention Award (First Class)
 May 7, 2019 National Labor Medal
 November 22, 2019 Member of the Chinese Academy of Engineering (CAE)

References

External links
Su Donglin on Beihang University 

1960 births
Living people
People from Jinan
Engineers from Shandong
Beihang University alumni
Academic staff of Beihang University
Members of the Chinese Academy of Engineering
Educators from Shandong